Sivech or Siuch or Seyuch may refer to:
 Sivech-e Olya
 Sivech-e Sofla